Cecil Howard Mackie (August 30, 1913 – March 9, 1952) was a Canadian ice hockey player who played 16 games in the National Hockey League with the Detroit Red Wings during the 1936–37 and 1937–38 seasons. The rest of his career, which lasted from 1932 to 1946, was mainly spent in the International American Hockey League/American Hockey League. While with Detroit MAckie won the Stanley Cup in 1937. He died of a heart attack on March 9, 1952.

Career statistics

Regular season and playoffs

External links
 

1913 births
1952 deaths
Canadian expatriate ice hockey players in the United States
Canadian ice hockey right wingers
Detroit Red Wings players
Hershey Bears players
Ice hockey people from Ontario
Kitchener Greenshirts players
Ontario Hockey Association Senior A League (1890–1979) players
Sportspeople from Kitchener, Ontario
Philadelphia Rockets players
Pittsburgh Hornets players
Stanley Cup champions